The 2012 Toyota Racing Series was the eighth running of the Toyota Racing Series, the premier open-wheeler motorsport category held in New Zealand. The 15-race competition was won by Nick Cassidy.

Teams and drivers
The series announced a 20-driver entry list on 28 December 2011.

Calendar
The calendar for the series was announced on 11 July 2011, and was held over five successive weekends in January and February.

Results

Championship standings

Scoring system

Drivers' Championship

References

External links
Official website of the Toyota Racing Series

Toyota Racing Series
Toyota Racing Series